Minuscule 839 (in the Gregory-Aland numbering), ε427 (von Soden), is a 14th-century Greek minuscule manuscript of the New Testament on parchment. The manuscript is not lacunose and good preserved.

Description 
The codex contains the text of the four Gospels, on 246 parchment leaves (size ). The text is written in one column per page, 22 lines per page.

There is also another division according to the smaller Ammonian Sections (in mark 241, 16:20), with references to the Eusebian Canons.

According to Scrivener the manuscript is in good preservation, the Eusebian Canon tables are exquisite.

Text 
The Greek text of the codex is a representative of the Byzantine text-type. Hermann von Soden classified it to the textual family Kx. Kurt Aland the Greek text of the codex placed in Category V.
According to the Claremont Profile Method it belongs to the textual cluster 490 and creates pair with 1486.

History 

Scrivener dated the manuscript to the 14th century, C. R. Gregory dated it to the 13th century. Currently the manuscript is dated by the INTF to the 14th century.

The manuscript was added to the list of New Testament manuscripts by Scrivener (630e) and Gregory (839e). Gregory saw it in 1886.

Currently the manuscript is housed at the University of Messina (Libr. 88), in Messina.

See also 

 List of New Testament minuscules
 Biblical manuscript
 Textual criticism
 Minuscule 840

References

Further reading

External links 
 

Greek New Testament minuscules
14th-century biblical manuscripts